In the mathematical field of knot theory, a knot polynomial is a knot invariant in the form of a polynomial whose coefficients encode some of the properties of a given knot.

History
The first knot polynomial, the Alexander polynomial, was introduced by James Waddell Alexander II in 1923. Other knot polynomials were not found until almost 60 years later.

In the 1960s, John Conway came up with a skein relation for a version of the Alexander polynomial, usually referred to as the Alexander–Conway polynomial. The significance of this skein relation was not realized until the early 1980s, when Vaughan Jones discovered the Jones polynomial. This led to the discovery of more knot polynomials, such as the so-called HOMFLY polynomial.

Soon after Jones' discovery, Louis Kauffman noticed the Jones polynomial could be computed by means of a partition function (state-sum model), which involved the bracket polynomial, an invariant of framed knots. This opened up avenues of research linking knot theory and statistical mechanics.

In the late 1980s, two related breakthroughs were made. Edward Witten demonstrated that the Jones polynomial, and similar Jones-type invariants, had an interpretation in Chern–Simons theory. Viktor Vasilyev and Mikhail Goussarov started the theory of finite type invariants of knots.  The coefficients of the previously named polynomials are known to be of finite type (after perhaps a suitable "change of variables").

In recent years, the Alexander polynomial has been shown to be related to Floer homology. The graded Euler characteristic of the knot Floer homology of Peter Ozsváth and Zoltan Szabó is the Alexander polynomial.

Examples

Alexander–Briggs notation is a notation that simply organizes knots by their crossing number. The order of Alexander–Briggs notation of prime knot is usually sured. (See List of prime knots.)

Alexander polynomials and Conway polynomials can not recognize the difference of left-trefoil knot and right-trefoil knot.

See also

Specific knot polynomials
Alexander polynomial
Bracket polynomial
HOMFLY polynomial
Jones polynomial
Kauffman polynomial

Related topics
Graph polynomial, a similar class of polynomial invariants in graph theory
Tutte polynomial, a special type of graph polynomial related to the Jones polynomial
Skein relation for a formal definition of the Alexander polynomial, with a worked-out example.

Further reading

Knot invariants
Polynomials